Oren is a masculine given name, meaning 'pine' or 'ash' in Hebrew. In the Book of Chronicles, Oren is one of the sons of Jerahmeel, the first-born of Hezron, along with Ram, Bunah, Ozem and Ahijah. 

Oren, as a given name or surname, may also refer to:

First name
Oren Aharoni (born 1973), Israeli basketball coach and former basketball player
Oren Ambarchi (born 1969), Australian musician
Oren Biton (born 1994), Israeli football player
Oren Burks (born 1995), American football player
Oren B. Cheney (1816–1903), American college president
Oren S. Copeland (1887–1958), American politician
Oren R. Earl (1813–1901), American politician
Oren Eizenman (born 1985), Israeli-Canadian ice hockey player
Oren Frood (1889–1943), Canadian ice hockey player
Oren Harman (born 1973), Israeli writer
Oren Harris (1903–1997), American politician and judge
Oren Koules (born 1961), American businessman
Oren Lavie (born 1976), Israeli musician and theatre director
Oren E. Long (1889–1965), American politician
Oren Lyons (born 1930), American artist
Oren Moverman (born 1966), Israeli filmmaker
Oren Muharer, Israeli football player (retired)
Oren Nissim (born 1976), Israeli footballer
Oren Patashnik (born 1954), American computer scientist
Oren Peli (born 1970), Israeli filmmaker
Oren Rudavsky (born 1957), American documentary filmmaker 
Oren Safdie (born 1965), Canadian playwright 
Oren Smadja (born 1970), Israeli judoka
Oren Wilkes (born 1988), American model
Oren Williams (born 1992), American actor
Oren Yiftachel (born 1956), Israeli geographer
Oren Yoel, American musician and music producer
Oren Zeitouni (born 1976), Israeli football player

Surname

Daniel Oren (born 1955), Israeli conductor
Eric Oren (1868-1937), American businessman and politician
Jeanette Kuvin Oren (born 1961), American artist
John Birdsell Oren (1909–2006), American admiral 
Menachem Oren (1903–1962), Israeli chess master and mathematician
Mordechai Oren (1905–1985), Israeli politician
Michael Oren (born 1955), Israeli diplomat and historian
Ram Oren (born 1936), Israeli author
Rony Oren (born 1953), Israeli animator

References

See also
Ören (disambiguation)
Orin (disambiguation)

Hebrew-language given names
Jewish given names
Hebrew masculine given names